Idrottsföreningen Kamraterna Göteborg, commonly known as IFK Göteborg, is a Swedish professional football club based in Gothenburg. IFK Göteborg is a member-owned association, and the club's annual general meeting is the highest policy-making body. Each club member has one vote. The general meeting approves the accounts, votes to elect the chairman and other board members, and decides on incoming motions. The most recently elected chairman is Richard Berkling.

The following is a list of chairmen of IFK Göteborg and the club's major titles from the founding of the club in 1904 to the present day. From its inception until 31 December 2017, all sections were part of the same sports club, but starting on 1 January 2018, the sections became separate organisations, under a parent alliance organisation called "IFK Göteborg". The previous organisation number was taken over by the new football organisation. The list includes chairmen of the club up to and including 2017, and chairmen of the football organisation from 2018 on, and does not include chairmen of individual sections or the alliance organisation. A separate board and chairman for football existed at times, for example in 1931 when Carl Linde was its chairman, while Knut Albrechtsson headed the club board.

As of the start of the 2021 season, 22 men have held the club chairmanship, of whom only one, Herbert Johansson, have held the job for multiple spells. Counting each of his two periods separately, there have been 23 chairmen. The most successful IFK Göteborg chairman in terms of trophies won is Gunnar Larsson, under whose stewardship the side won the Swedish championships ten times, Svenska Cupen three times, and the UEFA Cup twice. Nils Grönwall is the club's longest-serving chairman, having held the post for 22 years, from 1947 to 1968.

Key
Table headers
 From  and  To – If no exact date is given, the main years when the chairman held his position are displayed.
 Championship titles – Swedish championship title winning seasons while each man was chairman of IFK Göteborg. This column is sorted by number of titles won.
 Other titles – Other notable title the club won while the chairman held his position. The cell is sorted by number of titles won.
 Ref – Reference for the chairman.

Chairmen

Citations

References 

 
IFK Goteborg chairmen